Port Stephens, an open youthful tide-dominated drowned-valley estuary, is a large natural harbour of approximately  located in the Hunter Region of New South Wales, Australia.

The harbour lies wholly within the local government area of Port Stephens; although its northern shoreline forms the boundary between the Port Stephens and Mid-Coast local government areas.

Geography
Port Stephens is formed through the confluence of the Myall and Karuah rivers, Tilligerry Creek, and the Tasman Sea of the South Pacific Ocean. The lower port has a predominantly marine ecology and the upper port an estuarine ecology. The area to the east of Port Stephens comprises the Tomago/Tomaree/Stockton sand beds.

A narrow entrance between two striking hills of volcanic origin marks the opening of Port Stephens to the sea. The harbour is mostly shallow and sandy but contains sufficient deep water to accommodate large vessels.

The narrowest point is between Soldiers Point and Pindimar where the distance is only .

The Karuah River drains into Port Stephens at its north-western corner. Twelve Mile Creek drains into the port's south-western corner.

The southern shore of the port is divided into two distinct areas known as the Tomaree and Tilligerry peninsulas. While the Tilligerry Peninsula is geographically closer to major centres such as Sydney and Newcastle, it lacks the urban development that has occurred on the much larger ( vs  respectively) Tomaree peninsula. Although Lemon Tree Passage, on the Tilligerry Peninsula, and Soldiers Point, on the Tomaree Peninsula, are only  from each other, physical separation of the suburbs by Port Stephens and Tilligerry Creek results in them being almost  from each other by road.

The town of Karuah, located at the north-western corner of the port near the mouth of the Karuah River, experiences similar geographical separation from the Tilligerry Peninsula.

The western shore and the western part of the northern shore of the port are largely undeveloped with the flora ranging from scrubland in the west to the large tracts of bushland which are present along most of the northern shore. Closer to the mouth of the port, at and near Winda Woppa, sandy beaches are prevalent. Just outside the mouth of the port lie the two small insular nature reserves of Cabbage Tree Island and Boondelbah Island, both dedicated to the conservation of the threatened Gould's petrel, and with no public access.

History

The Worimi are the traditional owners for the area which is now called Port Stephens and the wider region is home to numerous sites of deep cultural significance to the Worimi.

The port was named by Captain Cook when he passed by on 11 May 1770, honouring Sir Philip Stephens, who was Secretary to the Admiralty. Stephens was a personal friend of Cook and had recommended him for command of the voyage. It seems Cook's initial choice had actually been Point Keppel and Keppel Bay, but instead he used Keppel Bay later.

The first ship to enter the port was the Salamander, a ship of the Third Fleet that later gave the suburb of Salamander Bay its name, in 1791. In that same year escaped convicts, then known as 'bolters', discovered coal in the area.

In 1795 the crew of  discovered a group of escaped convicts living with the Worimi people. Port Stephens became a popular haven for escaped convicts and so in 1820 a garrison of soldiers was established at what is now known as Soldiers Point.

The  cutter Lambton, commanded by Captain James Corlette, began shipping timber and wool out of the port in 1816. The suburb of Corlette was named after the captain.

Port Stephens has rather poor soil for the most part, and has limited agricultural potential. For this reason, no large towns developed there historically and it was never developed as a significant port.

Despite this, in 1920 there was a push for Port Stephens to be the capital city of a new state in a proposal originating from the country newspaper The Daily Observer. The proposal was the Observer'''s editor Victor Thompson's idea in response to continuing rural Australian antipathy at the Sydney-centralised funding and governance that many rural newspapers claimed had neglected to aid rural Australian towns.

During World War II, the remoteness and lack of any significant civilian population led to the Royal Australian Navy establishing HMAS Assault, an amphibious landing training establishment, at Nelson Bay. The sick bay from HMAS Assault'' still stands and is used by the Port Stephens Community Arts Centre.

A number of small towns developed around the port as fishing, holiday and retirement communities. Since the 1970s, with improved road access from Sydney, and the increasing popularity of coastal retirement lifestyles, there has been major expansion of these towns.

Port Stephens-Great Lakes Marine Park
The park was established to protect the wide variety of sea life that inhabit the port and nearby coastal areas of the Tasman Sea from just south of Forster to the northern end of Stockton Beach.

Demographics

At the time of the 2006 census, more than 85% of the population around Port Stephens resided in towns and suburbs that have developed on or near the southern shores of the port. More than 22,188 people live within  of the port in the suburbs of Corlette, Lemon Tree Passage, Mallabula, Nelson Bay, Oyster Cove, Salamander Bay, Shoal Bay, Soldiers Point, Tanilba Bay and Taylors Beach. Another 5,343 people live in other suburbs on the Tomaree peninsula that are within  of Port Stephens. These suburbs include Anna Bay, Boat Harbour, Bobs Farm, Fingal Bay, Fishermans Bay and One Mile.

Most urban development to the south of Port Stephens has occurred on the Tomaree peninsula in the suburbs of Corlette, Nelson Bay, Salamander Bay, Shoal Bay and Soldiers Point.

On the western shore is the suburb of Swan Bay, a small community of around 100 persons. The main industry in the area is oyster farming, however a small tourist resort is located near the mouth of Twelve Mile Creek. Karuah township, which has a population of 857, is at the north-western corner of the port, at the mouth of the Karuah River.

East of the Karuah River, in the Mid-Coast Council local government area there are 3,584 people living in Bundabah, Carrington, Hawks Nest, North Arm Cove, Pindimar, Tahlee and Tea Gardens.

Tourism and recreation
Port Stephens is a popular tourism destination with a strong focus on aquatic activities such as whale and dolphin watching, fishing and recreational boating and swimming.

Notes

  Although  of Anna Bay's shoreline actually touches Port Stephens near Taylor's Beach, none of its residents live in this area. The vast majority of Anna Bay residents live close to the Tasman Sea shoreline, well away from Port Stephens, although there is a small community living near the border between Anna Bay and Taylor's Beach.

References

External links

 
 
 
 
 
 
 
 

Port Stephens Council
Stephens
Tourist attractions in New South Wales
Bays of New South Wales
Mid-Coast Council
Beaches of New South Wales